Joglekar is an Indian name. It may refer to:

Archana Joglekar, Indian actress
Gautam Joglekar,  Indian actor
Manoj Joglekar (born 1973), Indian cricketer
Padmaja Phenany Joglekar, Hindustani Classical singer
Vasant Joglekar, Indian film director

Indian masculine given names